The Akron-class airships were a class of two rigid airships constructed for the US Navy in the early 1930s. Designed as scouting and reconnaissance platforms, the intention for their use was to act as "eyes for the fleet", extending the range at which the US Navy's Scouting Force could operate to beyond the horizon. This capability was extended further through the use of the airships as airborne aircraft carriers, with each capable of carrying a small squadron of airplanes that could be used both to increase the airship's scouting range, and to provide self-defense for the airship against other airborne threats.

The two ships were built as a continuation of the US Navy's rigid airship programme that had started just after World War I, and were used to further refine the tactics of the use of such machines in the fleet, predominantly over whether it was the airship that was the scout, with its air group only there for self-defense, or whether the airship was merely the mother ship and the aeroplanes were responsible for carrying out the long-range scouting mission.

Both ships had short careers in the US Navy, as each one crashed into the sea during routine flights less than two years after it was commissioned.

Background

The US Navy had been experimenting with rigid airships since shortly after the end of the First World War. In 1917, a German zeppelin, L 49, was forced down in France following a bombing raid over England, and was captured virtually undamaged. This led to the idea of the United States obtaining a pair of German airships as part of the reparations plan; however, the ones that were earmarked were destroyed by their crews in 1919. As a substitute plan, it was agreed that Germany would build and pay for an airship to be turned over to the Americans, while the US would build one of its own. The plan for the Germans to construct an airship was modified when the Royal Navy cancelled its own order for four rigid airships. The first ship of the class, R38, was already under construction, and so an agreement was reached in October 1919 to sell the incomplete airship to the United States, which gave it the designation ZR-2.

In 1921, ZR-2 was completed and undertook a number of test flights from its construction site at Cardington, before travelling for further testing over the North Sea, being based at Howden. During a test flight in August, ZR-2 experienced a catastrophic structural failure and crashed into the Humber Estuary, killing all but five aboard. Despite this setback, the US Navy continued with its rigid airship programme, starting construction of ZR-1 in June 1922. As a safety measure, it was decided that rather than use hydrogen as the lifting gas, which had been used on ZR-2, and which caused the fires following its crash, ZR-1 would be filled with helium. The scarcity of helium, and the expense of producing it, meant that the airship utilised most of the world's reserve of the gas. ZR-1 was commissioned into the US Navy as USS Shenandoah in October 1923. At this time, another new rigid airship was under construction at the Luftschiffbau Zeppelin works in Germany - intended to compensate for the ships intended for reparations after the war, the ship was also used as a means of keeping zeppelin construction alive in Germany. Owing to the scarcity of helium, upon its commissioning, Los Angeles utilised gas obtained from Shenandoah; the intention was to alternate use of the two airships until more of the gas could be procured.

The use of Shenandoah and Los Angeles as platforms to evolve the tactics of airship use with the fleet led to the US Navy instituting a plan to procure a pair of new, purpose-built airships, which originated in a set of design studies undertaken by the Bureau of Aeronautics in 1924 as BuAer Design No. 60, intended as an improvement over the Shenandoah design. The loss of Shenandoah in a crash in Ohio in September 1925 did not interrupt this; indeed, the incident left the US Navy with only one rigid airship that, under the terms of her construction, was not permitted to take part in military operations. As a consequence, a pair of new airships was authorized in June 1926, with the Goodyear-Zeppelin Corporation winning the contract to build them in October 1928. To facilitate construction, the company built a brand new construction and storage hangar, which came to be known as the Goodyear Airdock, at Akron, Ohio, in 1929.

Design

The two ships that would eventually become the Akron class were the first large rigid airships to be both designed and built in the US. Goodyear-Zeppelin was a joint venture between Goodyear and Luftschiffbau Zeppelin, with the sharing of German experts and ideas to train the employees of Goodyear in airship construction. As part of this collaboration, Luftschiffbau Zeppelin's Chief Stress Engineer, Karl Arnstein, went to the United States to work with Goodyear on new designs and techniques. This allowed Arnstein to develop ideas of airship design away from the more conservative methods employed by the German company's Chief Designer, Ludwig Dürr.

"Deep Rings" and triple keel
Most traditional zeppelin designs were composed of a series of main rings, made from a single reinforced girder, with unreinforced rings, which provided shape but not structural strength, in the spaces in between. Arnstein's proposal for the two new ships was to have the main rings composed of a pair of rings, connected by supports that formed triangles all around the circumference of the ring. These "deep rings", made of duraluminum, were spaced further apart than the single rings used in zeppelins, and were believed to offer greater strength, for which the US Navy was prepared to accept that the framework was heavier than in similar German produced airships. Similarly, rather than using a single structural keel along the underside of the hull, Arnstein's design had three, triangular shaped keels - one along the top of the airship, which was used to provide access to the valves of the ship's gas cells, and two more placed at 45 degree angles on each side of the bottom of the hull, which supported the engine compartments and crew spaces.

Engines and gas cells
Unlike in previous airship designs, the new US ships, with their triple keels and using of helium rather than hydrogen, were designed to have their engine compartments installed within the hull itself, rather than having external power cars, which had the benefits of easier access to the engines, and reduced drag in flight. The ships had installed a total of twelve gas cells made of gelatin-latex fabric, each containing  of helium.

One compromise that had to be reached over the placement of the engines was that they were mounted in a straight line. Most airships of the period had their engines mounted at different heights along the length of the hull, which allowed each propeller to operate in relatively "clean" air that had not been displaced by the propeller in front. However, attempting to re-engineer the structure of the hull to try and stagger the placement of the engines was seen as both adding too much weight and being too complex.

A design improvement that came about was with the propellers. Akron, as originally built, was fitted with  two-bladed, fixed-pitch wooden propellers to each of her engines but, in June 1932, was modified to be fitted with new, three-bladed, variable pitch metal propellers. These new propellers were fitted to Macon as standard while she was under construction, increasing the ship's fuel efficiency.

Tail and stabilizers
The design of the Akron class did away with the traditional cruciform tail and altered the shape and position of the stabilizers. The ship's stabilizers were originally designed to be secured on the hull at three main ring points, but this was changed by shortening them to have them secured at only two points, with the leading edge only attached to the intermediate frame rather than the load bearing structure. This design change came about following an incident involving the German passenger airship Graf Zeppelin, which, when taking off in 1929, had almost struck a set of power lines with its lower fin, which could not be seen from the ship's control gondola. In order to make the lower fin visible, the design was changed to shorten the fin. This proved to be a design flaw that eventually was a major contributory factor to the loss of Macon in 1935.

Water recovery
When the decision was taken to utilise helium instead of hydrogen back in 1922, Shenandoah was fitted with a set of condensers to allow the collection of water vapour from her engine exhausts to be used to create ballast and manage the ship's buoyancy. In most airship designs this would have been accomplished simply by venting gas as fuel was burned, but because helium was so expensive to produce (approximately $55 per 1000 ft3 in 1923), and Shenandoah had required approximately 2.1m ft3 to fill its gas cells, the decision was taken to not routinely vent the valuable gas, and instead collect water vapour. The Akron class required three times more gas to fill the cells, which made the collection of water more important, in spite of the increased availability of helium through improvements in production, transport and storage. The condensers appeared as black strips on the ship's envelope directly above each propeller.

Aircraft hangar
One of the significant innovations of the Akron class was the presence within the airship's hull of a hangar capable of accommodating up to five small aeroplanes, with a "trapeze" apparatus used for launching and recovering them; the aircraft were fitted with a "skyhook" apparatus that hooked up to a horizontal spar – for launch, the aircraft were hooked on within the hangar and lowered into the airstream, where the hook would be disconnected and the aircraft released, with the process working in reverse for recovery. In order that the ship had a stable equilibrium, rather than having the aircraft aboard on its departure, normal practice would have it setting off, before rendezvousing with the air group while airborne, and bringing them aboard using the trapeze. Each ship was built with individual hangar bays for each individual aircraft, with four hangars and space for a fifth aircraft to be stored on the trapeze. In Akron as built however, structural girders obstructed the two rearmost hangars, meaning that she was capable of accommodating up to three aircraft when first commissioned. Plans were in place to rectify this, but the ship was lost before this work could take place.

The Akron class also employed a "spy basket", a small aerodynamic gondola suspended from the ship by a line, which allowed observation of any enemy formation while the ship remained hidden within cloud cover.

Role and operation

The primary role of the Akron class was long-range reconnaissance, with their attainable height, long range and endurance enabling them to patrol far beyond visual range. The addition of the air group extended this capability even further, with the range of the aircraft allowing the airship to triple the size of its patrol area. However, there was disagreement over the best use of both the ship and her embarked air group. Initially, the Navy envisaged that the air group would be employed to provide fighter protection for the airship, with the ship itself undertaking the scouting, and thus proceeding right over the enemy. As a consequence, the primary aircraft carried was the Curtiss F9C Sparrowhawk, a small biplane fighter armed with a pair of .30in M1919 machine guns that was more suited to the air defence mission rather than reconnaissance. However, after several exercises in 1933 and 1934 showed that the ship itself was extremely vulnerable to attack both by aircraft and shipborne anti-aircraft fire, the Navy, over the objections of many officers such as Charles E. Rosendahl, who had commanded both Los Angeles and Akron, elected to alter the mission of the airship from direct scout, to genuine airborne aircraft carrier, with responsibility for command and control over its air group, leaving the reconnaissance to the air group itself. This tactical evolution began to be developed using Akron and, after she was lost, continued with Macon. A further development of the capability came when the Sparrowhawks were modified by removing their undercarriage and installing an additional external fuel tank, capable of carrying up to 30 gallons, thereby significantly increasing their range. The installation of the fuel tank, and RDF equipment, led to suggestions that the aircraft could scout an area up to 200 miles in any direction from the ship.

The Sparrowhawk was the primary operational aircraft carried by the Akron class, but two other types were used regularly; the Fleet N2Y-1 two-seat trainer was used as the primary training aircraft for new pilots to practice using the trapeze, as well as being the initial utility aircraft assigned to the air group, to permit individuals to fly to and from the ship as required. In 1934, these were supplemented by the purchase of a pair of modified Waco UBF two-seaters, redesignated as XJW-1s.

The evolution of the rigid airship as an aircraft carrier, that was developed using Macon, led to naval planners coming up with the idea of using airships for more than scouting operations, instead operating them as offensive weapons with an air group of dive bombers. This led to the ZRCV concept, which planned for a 9 million ft3 rigid airship, significantly bigger than the Akron class, capable of carrying up to nine Douglas-Northrop BT-1 dive bombers. However, the loss of Macon in early 1935, combined with President Roosevelt ordering a limitation on the size of new airships, meant that ZRCV was never more than an idea.

Ships
When the Bureau of Aeronautics first conceived its plan for a pair of new, large, purpose-built airships, it envisaged having one stationed on each coast, with facilities set up at NAS Sunnyvale (later NAS Moffett Field) in California and NAS Lakehurst in New Jersey. However, the two ships of the Akron-class never had the opportunity to serve together, as Akron was lost just over three weeks after the launch of Macon.

Akron

Work on Akron commenced on 7 November 1929 at the Goodyear Airdock in Akron, Ohio. The ship was christened on 8 August 1931 by Mrs Hoover, undertook her first flight trial on 23 September, and was commissioned on 27 October. Between November 1931 and January 1932, Akron undertook a number of training flights, before proceeding on her first mission with the Scouting Fleet off the coast of the Carolinas on 9 January 1932. On 22 February, the ship was damaged while being removed from the hangar at Lakehurst, which led to her missing the 1932 fleet problem exercise in the Pacific. On 3 May, Akron utilised the aircraft trapeze for the first time, before flying from Lakehurst to San Diego. From 1–4 June, Akron exercised with the Scouting Fleet off the coast of California, before returning to the east coast. The remainder of the year was spent in maintenance, and flight testing of the ship's new air group to develop the tactics for its use. In early March 1933, Akron was used as part of President Roosevelt's inauguration ceremony. On 3 April, the ship left Lakehurst to engage in the calibration of radio direction finders in New England. The ship was caught in a storm off the coast of New Jersey and crashed just after midnight on 4 April, killing 73 people on board, including Rear Admiral William Moffett, the Chief of the Bureau of Aeronautics.

Macon

Construction of Macon commenced at the Goodyear Airdock in October 1931, once Akron had been handed over the US Navy. She was christened on 11 March 1933 by the wife of Rear Admiral Moffett, before undertaking her first flight trial on 21 April. Macon was commissioned on 23 June, before departing for Lakehurst the same day. On 7 July, while cruising along Long Island Sound, the ship's air group came aboard for the first time. On 12 October, the ship departed Lakehurst for the transit flight to NAS Moffett Field in California, which was planned as the ship's permanent home base. Between November 1933 and January 1934, Macon undertook a number of exercises with the fleet, being "shot down" on many occasions by both carrier-based aircraft and anti-aircraft fire. In May, the ship returned to the east coast to participate in the 1934 fleet problem. In July, she undertook a training mission that included an attempt to intercept a pair of cruisers, including , which was taking President Roosevelt on vacation to Hawaii. For the remainder of 1934, the ship undertook a number of exercises, including the first use of new tactics that saw the ship used as an aircraft carrier, with its aircraft undertaking the reconnaissance mission. In this exercise, aircraft from Macon were able to locate the aircraft carrier  and keep her under surveillance for several hours. Macon was also able to show her versatility by being able to mark the position of the crews of two aircraft lost at sea until they could be rescued. In early 1935, the ship participated in further exercises until, on 12 February, while returning to Moffett Field, having lost one of her stabilisers, she made a forced landing in the sea off Point Sur, sinking with the loss of two of her crew.

References

Further reading
Grossnick, Roy A., "Kite Balloons to Airships. . . the Navy's Lighter-than-air Experience,", Washington, Government Printing Office, 1986
Hayward, John T., VADM USN "Comment and Discussion" United States Naval Institute Proceedings August 1978
Robinson, Douglas H. Giants in the Sky: History of the Rigid Airship. Henley-on-Thames, UK: Foulis, 1973. .

Airborne aircraft carriers
Goodyear aircraft
Akron-class airships
Articles containing video clips